Pratap Bose (born 1974) is a Bengali Indian automotive designer currently working in Mahindra and Mahindra.  "Mahindra taps Pratap Bose as chief design officer"], "The Times of India", 11 June 2021</ref> Before joining Mahindra, Pratap had been working in Tata Motors for 14 years. He had designed several models for Tata, including  Tigor, Tiago, Nexon, Tata Harrier and new Safari. Bose was also shortlisted for World Car Person of the Year 2021.

Education 
Pratap studied Industrial Design at the National Institute of Design, then graduated from the Royal College of Art in London with an MA in Vehicle Design in 2003.

References 

British automobile designers
Living people
1974 births